Jang Ye-won (born July 14, 1990) is a South Korean television personality and host. She was an announcer under SBS from October 2012, when she was known as the youngest announcer in the history of SBS. Jang officially announced her departure from SBS in September 2020.

Jang signed with SM Culture & Contents on December 9, 2020.

Filmography

Television shows

Web show

Radio Show

Awards and nominations

References

External links
 Jang Ye-won on Instagram

South Korean television presenters
South Korean women television presenters
1990 births
People from Seoul
Living people
South Korean announcers
South Korean television personalities
Sookmyung Women's University alumni